Wesley Heights Historic District is a national historic district located at Charlotte, Mecklenburg County, North Carolina, United States. The district encompasses 335 contributing buildings in the former streetcar suburb of Wesley Heights. It was developed after 1911 and includes notable examples of Bungalow / American Craftsman, Colonial Revival, and Tudor Revival style architecture.  Notable buildings include the Wesley Heights Methodist Episcopal Church (now Greater Bethel A. M. E. Church) designed by architect Louis H. Asbury, St. Mark's Baptist Church (formerly St. Andrew's Episcopal Church), Bomar Apartments (1928), and the Wadsworth House (1911) and Catawba Apartments also designed by Louis H. Asbury.

It was added to the National Register of Historic Places in 1995.

References

Streetcar suburbs
Historic districts on the National Register of Historic Places in North Carolina
Colonial Revival architecture in North Carolina
Tudor Revival architecture in North Carolina
Buildings and structures in Charlotte, North Carolina
National Register of Historic Places in Mecklenburg County, North Carolina